Wilder as die Wildtuin is the second album from South African electronic rock group Die Heuwels Fantasties, released in 2011 by Supra Familias in South Africa.

Track listing

References

Die Heuwels Fantasties albums
2011 albums